The 1992 Big Ten Conference baseball tournament was held at Trautman Field on the campus of Ohio State University in Columbus, Ohio, from May 15 through 19. The top four teams from the regular season participated in the double-elimination tournament, the twelfth annual tournament sponsored by the Big Ten Conference to determine the league champion.  won their fourth tournament championship and earned the Big Ten Conference's automatic bid to the 1992 NCAA Division I baseball tournament

Format and seeding 
The 1992 tournament was a 4-team double-elimination tournament, with seeds determined by conference regular season winning percentage only. Iowa claimed the second seed by tiebreaker over Illinois.

Tournament

All-Tournament Team 
The following players were named to the All-Tournament Team.

Most Outstanding Player 
Scott Bakkum was named Most Outstanding Player. Bakkum was a pitcher for Minnesota.

References 

Tournament
Big Ten baseball tournament
Big Ten Baseball Tournament
Big Ten baseball tournament